Arizona's 6th legislative district is one of 30 in the state, covering portions of Coconino, Yavapai, Navajo and Gila counties. As of 2021, there were 78 precincts in the district, 45 in Coconino, 18 in Gila, 10 in Yavapai and 5 in Navajo, with a total registered voter population of 151,011. The district has an overall population of 223,969.

Political representation
The district is represented for the 2021–2022 Legislative Session in the State Senate by Wendy Rogers (R) and in the House of Representatives by Brenda Barton (R) and Walter Blackman (R).

See also
 List of Arizona Legislative Districts
 Arizona State Legislature

References

External links
  (Information based on U.S. Census Bureau's American Community Survey).
 
 

Coconino County, Arizona
Yavapai County, Arizona
Navajo County, Arizona
Gila County, Arizona
Arizona legislative districts